Alois Johannes Lippl (1903–1957) was a German screenwriter and film director.

Selected filmography
 Marriage Strike (1935)
 The Last Four on Santa Cruz (1936)
 The Gambler (1938)
 A Heart Beats for You (1949)
 Marriages Forbidden (1957)

References

Bibliography
 Goble, Alan. The Complete Index to Literary Sources in Film. Walter de Gruyter, 1999.

External links

1903 births
1957 deaths
Film people from Munich